The Greenwood's shrew (Crocidura greenwoodi) is a species of mammal in the family Soricidae. It is endemic to Somalia. Its natural habitats are subtropical or tropical moist lowland forest, dry savanna, subtropical or tropical dry shrubland, and arable land.

References

Mammals of Somalia
Crocidura
Endemic fauna of Somalia
Mammals described in 1966
Taxonomy articles created by Polbot